Silesian or Upper Silesian is a West Slavic ethnolect of either the Lechitic group or the Czech–Slovak group, spoken by a small percentage of people in Upper Silesia. Its vocabulary was significantly influenced by Central German due to the existence of numerous Silesian German speakers in the area prior to World War II and after. Some regard it as one of the four major dialects of Polish, while others classify it as a separate language, distinct from Polish.

Distribution 
Silesian speakers currently live in the region of Upper Silesia, which is split between southwestern Poland and the northeastern Czech Republic. At present Silesian is commonly spoken in the area between the historical border of Silesia on the east and a line from Syców to Prudnik on the west as well as in the Rawicz area.

Until 1945, Silesian was also spoken in enclaves in Lower Silesia, where the majority population spoke Lower Silesian, a variety of Central German. The German-speaking populace was either evacuated en masse by German forces towards the end of the war or deported by the new administration upon the Polish annexation of Silesia after World War II. Before the war, most Slavic speakers also spoke German and, at least in eastern Upper Silesia, many German-speakers were acquainted with Slavic Silesian.

According to the last official census in Poland in 2011, about 509,000 people declared Silesian as their native language (in census 2002, about 60,000), and in the censuses in Poland, Czech Republic and Slovakia, nearly 0.9 million people declared Silesian nationality (
Upper Silesia has almost 5 million inhabitants, practically the vast majority in the Polish part of Upper Silesia speak Polish and Czech in the Czech part and declare themselves as Poles in the Polish part and Czechs in the Czech part.).

Grammar 
Although the morphological differences between Silesian and Polish have been researched extensively, other grammatical differences have not been studied in depth.

A notable difference is in question-forming. In standard Polish, questions which do not contain interrogative words are formed either by using intonation or the interrogative particle . In Silesian, questions which do not contain interrogative words are formed by using intonation (with a markedly different intonation pattern than in Polish) or inversion (e.g. ); there is no interrogative particle.

Example 
 
According to Jan Miodek, standard Polish has always been used by Upper Silesians as a language of prayers.
The Lord's Prayer in Silesian, Polish, Czech, and English:

Dialects of Silesian 

Silesian has many dialects:
 Dialects spoken in areas which are now part of Poland, former Prussian Silesia:
 Kluczbork Silesian dialect (1)
 Opole Silesian dialect (2)
 Niemodlin Silesian dialect (3)
 Prudnik Silesian dialect (4)
 Gliwice Silesian dialect (5)
 Sulkovian Silesian dialect
 Borderland Silesian-Lesser Polish dialect (6a & 6b)
 Borderland Silesian-Lach dialect (9)
 Dialects spoken on both sides of the Czech–Polish border, former Austrian Silesia:
 Cieszyn Silesian dialect (7)
 Jabłonków Silesian dialect (8)
 Lach dialects spoken in areas which are now part of the Czech Republic, often considered linguistically apart from the ones mentioned above:
 Opava subdialect
 Ostrava subdialect
 Frenštát subdialect

Dialect vs. language

Politicization
Opinions are divided among linguists regarding whether Silesian is a distinct language, a dialect of Polish, or in the case of Lach, a variety of Czech. The issue can be contentious, because some Silesians consider themselves to be a distinct nationality within Poland. When Czechs, Poles, and Germans each made claims to substantial parts of Silesia as constituting an integral part of their respective nation-states in the 19th and 20th centuries, the language of Slavic speaking Silesians became politicized.

Some, like Óndra Łysohorsky, a poet and author in Czechoslovakia, saw the Silesians as being their own distinct people, which culminated in his effort to create a literary standard he called the "Lachian language". Silesian inhabitants supporting the cause of each of these ethnic groups had their own robust network of supporters across Silesia's political borders which shifted over the course of the 20th century prior to the large-scale ethnic cleansing in the aftermath of World War II.

Views
Some linguists from Poland such as Jolanta Tambor, Juan Lajo, Dr Tomasz Wicherkiewicz and philosopher Dr hab Jerzy Dadaczyński, sociologist Dr Elżbieta Anna Sekuła and sociolinguist Tomasz Kamusella support its status as a language. According to Stanisław Rospond, it is impossible to classify Silesian as a dialect of the contemporary Polish language because he considers it to be descended from the Old Polish language. Other Polish linguists, such as Jan Miodek and Edward Polański, do not support its status as a language. Jan Miodek and Dorota Simonides, both of Silesian origin, prefer conservation of the entire range of Silesian dialects rather than standardization.
The German linguist Reinhold Olesch was eagerly interested in the "Polish vernaculars" of Upper Silesia and other Slavic varieties such as Kashubian and Polabian.

United States Immigration Commission in 1911 classified it as one of the dialects of Polish.

Most linguists writing in English, such as Alexander M. Schenker, Robert A. Rothstein, and Roland Sussex and Paul Cubberley in their respective surveys of Slavic languages, list Silesian as a dialect of Polish, as does Encyclopædia Britannica.

Gerd Hentschel wrote as a result of his paper about the question whether Silesian is a new Slavic language, that "Silesian ... can thus ... without doubt be described as a dialect of Polish" ("").

In Czechia, disagreement exists concerning the Lach dialects which rose to prominence thanks to Óndra Łysohorsky and his translator Ewald Osers. While some have considered it a separate language, most now view Lach as a dialect of Czech.

Writing system 
There have been a number of attempts at codifying the language spoken by Slavophones in Silesia. Probably the most well-known was undertaken by Óndra Łysohorsky when codifying the Lachian dialects in creating the Lachian literary language in the early 20th century.

Ślabikŏrzowy szrajbōnek is the relatively new alphabet created by the Pro Loquela Silesiana organization to reflect the sounds of all Silesian dialects. It was approved by Silesian organizations affiliated in Rada Górnośląska. Ubuntu translation is in this alphabet as is the Silesian Wikipedia. It is used in a few books, including the Silesian alphabet book.

 Letters: A, Ã, B, C, Ć, D, E, F, G, H, I, J, K, L, Ł, M, N, Ń, O, Ŏ, Ō, Ô, Õ, P, R, S, Ś, T, U, W, Y, Z, Ź, Ż.

One of the first alphabets created specifically for Silesian was Steuer's Silesian alphabet, created in the Interwar period and used by Feliks Steuer for his poems in Silesian. The alphabet consists of 30 graphemes and eight digraphs:

 Letters: A, B, C, Ć, D, E, F, G, H, I, J, K, L, Ł, M, N, Ń, O, P, R, S, Ś, T, U, Ů, W, Y, Z, Ź, Ż
 Digraphs: Au, Ch, Cz, Dz, Dź, Dż, Rz, Sz

 Letters: A, B, C, Ć, Č, D, E, F, G, H, I, J, K, L, M, N, Ń, O, P, R, Ř, S, Ś, Š, T, U, Ů, W, Y, Z, Ź, Ž.

Silesian's phonetic alphabet replaces the digraphs with single letters (Sz with Š, etc.) and does not include the letter Ł, whose sound can be represented phonetically with U. It is therefore the alphabet that contains the fewest letters. Although it is the most phonetically logical, it did not become popular with Silesian organizations, with the argument that it contains too many caron diacritics and hence resembles the Czech alphabet. Large parts of the Silesian Wikipedia, however, are written in Silesian's phonetic alphabet.

Sometimes other alphabets are also used, such as the "Tadzikowy muster" (for the National Dictation Contest of the Silesian language) or the Polish alphabet, but writing in this alphabet is problematic as it does not allow for the differentiation and representation of all Silesian sounds.

Culture 

Silesian has recently seen an increased use in culture, for example:
 , online news and information platform (founded in January 2018)
 YouTube personalities such as Niklaus Pieron
 TV and radio stations (for example: TV Silesia, Sfera TV, TVP Katowice, Slonsky Radio, Radio Piekary, Radio Silesia, Radio Fest);
 Music groups (for example: , Krzysztof Hanke, Hasiok, FEET);
 Theatre (for example: Polterabend in Silesian Theatre);
 Plays
 Film (for example:  ("Grzeszny żywot Franciszka Buły")
 Books (for example, the so-called ; poetry: "Myśli ukryte" by Karol Gwóźdź)
 Teaching aides (for example, a Silesian basal reader)

Recognition 

In 2003, the National Publishing Company of Silesia commenced operations. This publisher was founded by the Alliance of the People of the Silesian Nation and it prints books about Silesia and books in Silesian language.

In July 2007, the Slavic Silesian language was given the ISO 639-3 code szl.

On 6 September 2007, 23 politicians of the Polish parliament made a statement about a new law to give Silesian the official status of a regional language.

The first official National Dictation Contest of the Silesian language took place in August 2007. In dictation as many as 10 forms of writing systems and orthography have been accepted.

On 26 May 2008, the Silesian Wikipedia was founded.

On 30 June 2008 in the edifice of the Silesian Parliament in Katowice, a conference took place on the status of the Silesian language. This conference was a forum for politicians, linguists, representatives of interested organizations and persons who deal with the Silesian language. The conference was titled "Silesian – Still a Dialect or Already a Language?".

In 2012, the Ministry of Administration and Digitization registered the Silesian language in Annex 1 to the Regulation on the state register of geographical names; however, in a November 2013 amendment to the regulation, Silesian is not included.

See also 
 List of Silesian-language films
 Masurian dialect
 Silesian German
 Texas Silesian
 Wymysorys language

Literature
 Paul Weber. 1913. Die Polen in Oberschlesien: eine statistische Untersuchung. Verlagsbuchhandlung von Julius Springer in Berlin (in German)
 Norbert Morciniec. 1989. Zum Wortgut deutscher Herkunft in den polnischen Dialekten Schlesiens. Zeitschrift für Ostforschung, Bd. 83, Heft 3 (in German)
 Joseph Partsch. 1896. Schlesien: eine Landeskunde für das deutsche Volk. T. 1., Das ganze Land (die Sprachgrenze 1790 und 1890; pp. 364–367). Breslau: Verlag Ferdinand Hirt. (in German)
 Joseph Partsch. 1911. Schlesien: eine Landeskunde für das deutsche Volk. T. 2., Landschaften und Siedelungen. Breslau: Verlag Ferdinand Hirt. (in German)
 Lucyna Harc et al. 2013. Cuius Regio? Ideological and Territorial Cohesion of the Historical Region of Silesia (c. 1000–2000) vol. 1., The Long Formation of the Region Silesia (c. 1000–1526). Wrocław: eBooki.com.pl 
 Lucyna Harc et al. 2014. Cuius regio? Ideological and Territorial Cohesion of the Historical Region of Silesia (c. 1000–2000) vol. 2., The Strengthening of Silesian Regionalism (1526–1740). Wrocław: eBooki.com.pl 
 Lucyna Harc et al. 2014. Cuius regio? Ideological and Territorial Cohesion of the Historical Region of Silesia (c. 1000–2000) vol. 4., Region Divided: Times of Nation-States (1918–1945). Wrocław: eBooki.com.pl 
 Tomasz Kamusella. 2014. Ślōnsko godka / The Silesian Language. Zabrze: NOS, 196 pp. 
 Tomasz Kamusella and Motoki Nomachi. 2014. The Long Shadow of Borders: The Cases of Kashubian and Silesian in Poland (pp 35–60). The Eurasia Border Review. Vol 5, No 2, Fall.
 Review: Mark Brüggemann. 2013. Ślōnsko godka. The Silesian language
 Review: Michael Moser (uk). 2013. Zeitschrift für Slawistik (pp 118–119). Vol 58, No 1. Potsdam: Universität Potsdam.
 Tomasz Kamusella. 2014. Warszawa wie lepiej Ślązaków nie ma. O dyskryminacji i języku śląskim [Warsaw Knows Better – The Silesians Don't Exist: On Discrimination and the Silesian Language]. Zabrze, Poland: NOS, 174 pp. .
 Review: . 2013. Zeitschrift für Slawistik (pp 118–119). Vol 58, No 1. Potsdam: Universität Potsdam.
 Tomasz Kamusella. 2013. The Silesian Language in the Early 21st Century: A Speech Community on the Rollercoaster of Politics (pp 1–35). Die Welt der Slaven. Vol 58, No 1.
 Tomasz Kamusella. 2011. Silesian in the Nineteenth and Twentieth Centuries: A Language Caught in the Net of Conflicting Nationalisms, Politics, and Identities (pp 769–789). 2011. Nationalities Papers. No 5.
 
 Tomasz Kamusella. 2009. Échanges de paroles ou de coups en Haute-Silésie: la langue comme 'lieu' de contacts et de luttes interculturels [Exchange of Words or Blows in Upper Silesia: Language as a "Place" of Contacts and Intercultural Struggles] (pp 133–152). Cultures d'Europe centrale. No 8: Lieux communs de la multiculturalité urbaine en Europe centrale, ed by Delphine Bechtel and Xavier Galmiche. Paris: CIRCE.
 Tomasz Kamusella. 2007. Uwag kilka o dyskryminacji Ślązaków i Niemców górnośląskich w postkomunistycznej Polsce [A Few Remarks on the Discrimination of the Silesians and Upper Silesia's Germans in Postcommunist Poland]. Zabrze, Poland: NOS, 28 pp. .
 Tomasz Kamusella. 2006. Schlonzsko: Horní Slezsko, Oberschlesien, Górny Śląsk. Esej o regionie i jego mieszkańcach [Schlonzsko: Upper Silesia. An Essay on the Region and Its Inhabitants] (2nd, corrected and enlarged edition). Zabrze, Poland: NOS, 148 pp. .
 Review: Anon. 2010. The Sarmatian Review. Sept. (p 1530).
 Review: Svetlana Antova. 2007. Bulgarian Ethnology / Bulgarska etnologiia. No 4 (pp 120–121).
 Tomasz Kamusella. 2009. Codzienność komunikacyjno-językowa na obszarze historycznego Górnego Śląska [The Everyday Language Use in Historical Upper Silesia] (pp 126–156). In: Robert Traba, ed. Akulturacja/asymilacja na pograniczach kulturowych Europy Środkowo-Wschodniej w XIX i XX wieku [Acculturation/Assimilation in the Cultural Borderlands of East-Central Europe in the 19th and 20th Centuries] (vol 1: Stereotypy i pamięć [Stereotypes and memory]). Warsaw: Instytut Studiów Politycznych PAN and Niemiecki Instytut Historyczny.
 Tomasz Kamusella. 2009. Czy śląszczyzna jest językiem? Spojrzenie socjolingwistyczne [Is Silesian a Language? A Sociolinguistic View] (pp 27–35). In: Andrzej Roczniok, ed. Śląsko godka – jeszcze gwara czy jednak już język? / Ślōnsko godko – mundart jeszcze eli już jednak szpracha. Zabrze: NOŚ.
 Tomasz Kamusella. 2006. Schlonzska mowa. Język, Górny Śląsk i nacjonalizm (Vol II) [Silesia and Language: Language, Upper Silesia and Nationalism, a collection of articles on various social, political and historical aspects of language use in Upper Silesia]. Zabrze, Poland: NOS, 151 pp. .
 Tomasz Kamusella. 2005. Schlonzska mowa. Język, Górny Śląsk i nacjonalizm (Vol I) [Silesia and Language: Language, Upper Silesia and Nationalism, a collection of articles on various social, political and historical aspects of language use in Upper Silesia]. Zabrze, Poland: NOS, 187 pp. .
 Review: Kai Struve. 2006. Zeitschrift für Ostmitteleuropa-Forschung. No 4. Marburg, Germany: Herder-Institut (pp 611–613).
 Review: Kai Struve. 2007. Recenzyjo Instituta Herdera [Herder-Institute’s Review] (pp 26–27). Ślůnsko Nacyjo. No 5, Jul. Zabrze: NOŚ.
 Review: Jerzy Tomaszewski. 2007. Czy istnieje naród śląski? [Does the Silesian Nation Exist] (pp 280–283). Przegląd Historyczny. No 2. Warsaw: DiG and University of Warsaw.
 Review: Jerzy Tomaszewski. 2007. Czy istnieje naród śląski? [Does the Silesian Nation Exist] (pp 8–12). 2007. Ślůnsko Nacyjo. No 12, Dec. Zabrze: NOŚ.
 Tomasz Kamusella. 2004. The Szlonzokian Ethnolect in the Context of German and Polish Nationalisms (pp. 19–39). Studies in Ethnicity and Nationalism. No 1. London: Association for the Study of Ethnicity and Nationalism. . 
 Tomasz Kamusella. 2001. Schlonzsko: Horní Slezsko, Oberschlesien, Górny Śląsk. Esej o regionie i jego mieszkańcach [Schlonzsko: Upper Silesia. An Essay on the Region and Its Inhabitants]. Elbląg, Poland: Elbląska Oficyna Wydawnicza, 108 pp. .
 Review: Andreas R Hofmann. 2002. Zeitschrift für Ostmitteleuropa-Forschung. No 2. Marburg, Germany: Herder-Institut (p 311).
 Review: Anon. 2002. Esej o naszym regionie [An Essay on Our region] (p 4). Głos Ludu. Gazeta Polaków w Republice Czeskiej. No 69, 11 June. Ostrava, Czech Republic: Vydavatelství OLZA.
 Review: Walter Żelazny :eo:Walter Żelazny. 2003. Niech żyje śląski lud [Long Live the Silesian People] (pp 219–223). Sprawy Narodowościowe. No 22. Poznań, Poland: Zakład Badań Narodowościowych PAN.
 Tomasz Kamusella. 1999. Język a Śląsk Opolski w kontekście integracji europejskiej [Language and Opole Silesia in the Context of European Integration] (pp 12–19). Śląsk Opolski. No 3. Opole, Poland: Instytut Śląski.
 Tomasz Kamusella. 1998. Das oberschlesische Kreol: Sprache und Nationalismus in Oberschlesien im 19. und 20. Jahrhundert [The Upper Silesian Creole: Language and Nationalism in the 19th and 20th Centuries] (pp 142–161). In: Markus Krzoska und Peter Tokarski, eds. . Die Geschichte Polens und Deutschlands im 19. und 20. Jahrhundert. Ausgewählte Baiträge. Osnabrück, Germany: fibre.
 Tomasz Kamusella. 1998. Kreol górnośląski [The Upper Silesian Creole] (pp 73–84). Kultura i Społeczeństwo. No 1. Warsaw, Poland: Komitet Socjologii ISP PAN.
 Andrzej Roczniok and Tomasz Kamusella. 2011. Sztandaryzacyjo ślōnski godki / Standaryzacja języka śląskiego [The Standardization of the Silesian Language] (pp 288–294). In: I V Abisigomian, ed. Lingvokul’turnoe prostranstvo sovremennoi Evropy cherez prizmu malykh i bolshikh iazykov. K 70-letiiu professora Aleksandra Dimitrievicha Dulichenko (Ser: Slavica Tartuensis, Vol 9). Tartu: Tartu University.
 Robert Semple. London 1814.  Observations made on a tour from Hamburg through Berlin, Gorlitz, and Breslau, to Silberberg; and thence to Gottenburg (pp. 122–123)

Notes

References

External links 

  

 
Languages of Germany
Languages of Poland
Languages of the Czech Republic
Lechitic languages
Slavic languages written in Latin script